Azzaba is a commune in Sefrou Province of the Fès-Meknès administrative region of Morocco. At the time of the 2004 census, the commune had a total population of 2493 people living in 515 households.

References

Populated places in Sefrou Province
Rural communes of Fès-Meknès